The Brooklyn Dodgers were an American basketball team based in Brooklyn, New York that was a member of the Eastern Basketball Association.

Year-by-year

Basketball teams in New York City
Defunct basketball teams in the United States
Sports in Brooklyn